Felix Slováček (born May 23, 1943 in Zlín) is a Czech clarinetist, conductor, film composer, and saxophonist. He is married to the Czech actress Dagmar Patrasová.

Life 
In his youth he studied Piano and Violin, but disliked doing so. His interest in clarinet, and later, saxophone began after finishing high school. He has worked in classical music, children's music, jazz, and he conducts the "Felix Slováček Big Band." Throughout his career, he has sold over two million albums.

Discography 
 1998 Felix Slováček Con Amore (Český rozhlas)
 1998 Felix Slováček Big Band – Happy-Go-Lucky (Český rozhlas)
 1997 20 x Felix Slováček (Bonton music)
 1996 Rozvíjej se, poupátko
 1996 Felix Slováček a jeho Beatles (Monitor-EMI)
 1996 Felix Slováček – Saxo (Bonton music)
 1994 Dvorana slávy
 1994 Felix Slováček – Classic Essential (Supraphon)
 1993 For Lovers (Supraphon)
 1982 The Velvet Sound of Felix Slováček (Supraphon)

References

External links 
 
 

1943 births
Clarinetists
Czech film score composers
Male film score composers
Czech musicians
Living people
People from Zlín
Czech saxophonists
Janáček Academy of Music and Performing Arts alumni
Recipients of Medal of Merit (Czech Republic)
21st-century saxophonists
21st-century clarinetists
21st-century Czech male musicians
Male jazz musicians